Jennifer Goolsbee (born September 6, 1968) is a former competitive ice dancer who is best known for her partnership with Hendryk Schamberger for Germany. With Schamberger, she is a four-time German national champion and placed ninth at the 1994 Winter Olympics.

Career 
Early in her career, Goolsbee competed with James Schilling for the United States.

In 1990, Goolsbee teamed up with German ice dancer Hendryk Schamberger to compete for Germany. They were coached by Martin Skotnicky in Oberstdorf. They won the German national title four times and competed at the 1994 Winter Olympics, placing ninth. Goolsbee/Schamberger finished as high as seventh at the World Championships (1994) and eighth at the European Championships (1995). They parted ways in 1995.

Goolsbee later had a brief partnership with Armenian ice dancer Samuel Gezalian. They won the German title in 1997.

Goolsbee and Schamberger teamed up again in 1997 to skate in shows.

Personal life 
Goolsbee received German citizenship in December 1993. She moved back to the United States in 1998. In 2001, she married former ice dancer Kyle Schneble, with whom she has a daughter, Jordyn, and son, Rush.

Competitive highlights

With Gezalian

With Schamberger

With Schilling

References

German female ice dancers
1968 births
Olympic figure skaters of Germany
Figure skaters at the 1994 Winter Olympics
Living people
Figure skaters from Detroit
Naturalized citizens of Germany
American female ice dancers
American emigrants to Germany